Harry Shannon may refer to:

 Harry Shannon (actor) (1890–1964), American character actor
 Harry Shannon (songwriter) (born 1948), American songwriter